John Ford Clymer  (January 29, 1907 – November 2, 1989) was an American painter and illustrator known for his nature works featuring the American West.

Early life and education 
Born in Ellensburg, Washington, Clymer first studied art through an Art Instruction School correspondence course.

Career 
Clymer continued to study art in Canada, where he spent eight years illustrating for Canadian magazines.

In Westport, Connecticut, Clymer established his career as an illustrator for American magazines, including Argosy, The Saturday Evening Post, Woman's Day and Field and Stream. Clymer created 80 covers for The Saturday Evening Post.

While in the Marine Corps, he illustrated for Leatherneck Magazine and the Marine Corps Gazette. His work in advertising included paintings for White Horse Scotch Whisky, the Pennsylvania Railroad and the Chrysler Corporation.

Awards
In 1976, Clymer received the Prix de West from the Academy of Western Art. His oils and charcoal drawings earned him awards from the Cowboy Artists of America. He was named Western Artist of the Year by the National Wildlife Art Collectors Society. In 1988, he was awarded the Rungius Medal from the National Museum of Wildlife Art for his painting Late Arrivals, Green River Rendezvous. He was made a member of the Royal Canadian Academy of Arts.

His work is on permanent exhibit at the Clymer Museum of Art, located at 416 North Pearl Street in Ellensburg, Washington.

Personal life 
In 1932, he married his childhood sweetheart, and in the fall of 1937, the couple moved to Westport, Connecticut. Clymer died on November 2, 1989 in Bellevue, Washington.

References

External links
John Clymer collection at the National Museum of American Illustration
The Clymer Museum & Gallery
National Museum of Wildlife Art: Virtual tour of Clymer Studio

1907 births
1989 deaths
American magazine illustrators
20th-century American painters
American male painters
Artists of the American West
Members of the Royal Canadian Academy of Arts
People from Ellensburg, Washington
20th-century American male artists